Slapstick of Another Kind is a 1984 American comic science fiction film starring Jerry Lewis, Madeline Kahn and Marty Feldman. It was filmed in 1982, and released in March 1984 by both The S. Paul Company/Serendipity Entertainment Releasing Company and International Film Marketing. The film was written and directed by Steven Paul and is based on the novel Slapstick (1976) by Kurt Vonnegut.

Plot
The People's Republic of China is severing relations with all other nations. They have mastered the art of miniaturization, and have shrunk all their people to the height of two inches. The ambassador of China, Ah Fong, announces during a press conference that the key to all knowledge can be found from twins.

Caleb Swain and his wife Letitia are called "the most beautiful of all the beautiful people" by the press. However, when Letitia gives birth to twins who are called "monsters", the family doctor, Dr. Frankenstein informs the parents that the twins won't live more than a few months. The Swains decide to allow the twins to live their short life in a mansion staffed with servants, including Sylvester.

Fifteen years later, the twins are still alive. They have large heads and appear to be mentally disabled. Their parents, who have not seen them in all those years, receive a visit from the former Chinese ambassador who informs them that their children are geniuses who can solve the world's problems.

Along with the President of the United States, the parents pay the children a visit. They reveal themselves to be well-behaved and intelligent, explaining that they behaved "stupid" around the servants because they were simply emulating them.

A series of tests reveal that there is a telepathic connection between the twins, and their intelligence is only functional when they are together. Furthermore, when their heads are touching they reach a level of intelligence that has never been surpassed.

Fearful that incest may be prevalent, the parents separate the two. They become despondent without each other, and the Chinese ambassador appears again to order them to seek out each other. Once united, a spaceship appears and reveals that they are really aliens who were sent to Earth to solve all of the planet's problems. However, their alien father reveals that Earth cannot handle their intelligence and returns them to their home world.

Cast
 Jerry Lewis as Wilbur Swain / Caleb Swain
 Madeline Kahn as Eliza Swain / Letetia Swain
 Marty Feldman as Sylvester
 John Abbott as Dr. Frankenstein
 Jim Backus as President of the United States
 Samuel Fuller as Colonel Sharp
 Merv Griffin as Anchorman
 Pat Morita as Ah Fong, the Chinese Ambassador

Production
The film was loosely based on the novel Slapstick: Or Lonesome No More! by Kurt Vonnegut. Director Steven Paul had played Paul Ryan in the stage production of Vonnegut's Happy Birthday, Wanda June and reprised the role in Mark Robson's film adaptation. Paul's screenplay shifted away from the serious aspects of the novel and placed more emphasis on its humor, as well as excluding Vonnegut's view of groups as extended families "whose spiritual core is common decency", and the importance of courtesy, kindness and dignity. Vonnegut considered the novel to be his worst work.

Martial artist Peter Kwong made one of his earliest appearances in this film, playing an astronaut in a flying fortune cookie.

Release
This film was released in Europe in 1982, but did not see a US release until March 1984 at the Pacific's Picwood Theatre in Los Angeles. It was released to cable television as Slapstick. There are two different versions, the 1982 version running 84 minutes, and the 1984 version, running 82 minutes. Lewis promoted the US release on the March 21, 1984 episode of The Tonight Show Starring Johnny Carson.

Reception
Gene Siskel and Roger Ebert panned the film in their show At the Movies. Siskel described it as "the single worst movie of 1984", saying it was shockingly bad, insensitive, cruel, boring, unfunny and cheaply made. He summed up by proposing that film encyclopedias "ought to have an entry called Bad Movie and the illustration ought to be a still photo from Slapstick of Another Kind... The best thing that could ever happen to this film is that it never be shown anywhere." Ebert concurred, describing the film as offensive, unsavory and painful. However, Siskel & Ebert did not mention the film on their "Worst of 1984" special show.

In At Millennium's End: New Essays on the Work of Kurt Vonnegut, Kevin Alexander Boon said that the film "circumvents everything that is intelligent about Vonnegut's fiction" and that it is one of the worst adaptations of Vonnegut's work.

Leonard Maltin praised the performances of Jerry Lewis and Sam Fuller, but described the film as "appalling".

Lewis was nominated for the Golden Raspberry for Worst Actor for his role in this film.

Nathan Rabin, writing for The A.V. Club, called the film "a crass violation of everything Vonnegut stood for".

References

External links
 
 
 

1984 films
1980s science fiction comedy films
1980s fantasy comedy films
1982 independent films
1980s satirical films
American science fiction comedy films
American fantasy comedy films
American independent films
American satirical films
Films based on works by Kurt Vonnegut
Films based on American novels
Films based on science fiction novels
1982 comedy films
1982 films
1984 comedy films
1980s English-language films
1980s American films